Paul Breuer (born 25 June 1950) is a German politician. He represents the CDU. Breuer served as a member of the Bundestag from the state of North Rhine-Westphalia from 1980 to 2003.

Life 
In 1980 he was elected to the German Bundestag via the state list of the CDU North Rhine-Westphalia. In the elections from 1983 to 1994 he won the constituency of Siegen-Wittgenstein directly. In 1998 and 2002 he again entered the Bundestag via the state list. Breuer was spokesman for defense policy of the CDU/CSU faction from 1992 to 2003. From 2003 to 2014 he was District Administrator of the Siegen-Wittgenstein district.

References

External links 

 Web archive of the German Bundestag of 15 November 2005 
 

 

1950 births
Living people
People from Siegen-Wittgenstein
Members of the Bundestag for North Rhine-Westphalia
Members of the Bundestag 2002–2005
Members of the Bundestag 1998–2002
Members of the Bundestag 1994–1998
Members of the Bundestag 1990–1994
Members of the Bundestag 1987–1990
Members of the Bundestag 1983–1987
Members of the Bundestag 1980–1983
Members of the Bundestag for the Christian Democratic Union of Germany